Bill Thompson may refer to:

Politics
 William Hale Thompson (1868–1944), known as Big Bill Thompson, Mayor of Chicago
 Bill Thompson (Wyoming politician) (1937–2018), member of the Wyoming State House of Representatives
 Bill Thompson (South Dakota politician) (born 1949), South Dakota State House of Representatives
 Bill Thompson (New York politician) (born 1953), New York City Comptroller and Democratic nominee for mayor
 Bill Thompson (Ohio politician), Ohio House of Representatives
 Bill Thompson (Arkansas politician), long-serving state legislator

Sports
 Bill Thompson (Australian footballer) (1876–1965), Australian rules footballer for Fitzroy
 Bill Thompson (racing driver) (1906–1945), 3-time winner of the Australian Grand Prix in the 1930s
 Bill Thompson (Scottish footballer) (1921–1988), for Portsmouth and Bournemouth, manager in England and the Netherlands
 Bill Thompson (English footballer) (1940–2011), for Newcastle, Rotherham and Darlington
 Bill Thompson (American football) (born 1946), American football player
 Bill R. Thompson (born 1949), Australian rules footballer for Essendon
 Bill Thompson (basketball), American professional basketball player
 Bill Thompson (Nottingham Forest footballer) (1899–1959), English football player for Nottingham Forest

Other
 Bill Thompson (manager) (1944–2015), of Jefferson Airplane and Jefferson Starship
 Bill Thompson (technology writer) (born 1960), UK technology writer
 Bill Thompson (television host) (1931–2014), creator and co-host of the children's television program The Wallace and Ladmo Show
 Bill Thompson (voice actor) (1913–1971), voice of Droopy Dog
 Bill Thompson (bishop) (1946–2020), Anglican bishop of the Diocese of Western Anglicans (U.S.)
 Bill Thompson III (1962–2019), editor of Bird Watcher's Digest
 William Forde Thompson, known as Bill Thompson, Australian psychologist

See also 
Billy Thompson (disambiguation)
William Thompson (disambiguation)